John R. Clarke is Annie Laurie Howard Regents Professor of Fine Arts, University of Texas at Austin, teaching in the Department of Art and Art History. Clarke (Ph.D. Yale, 1973), joined the University of Texas at Austin in 1980. His research and teaching focus on Roman art and archaeology, art-historical methodology, art of the sixties, and digital modeling.

Clarke was a Trustee of the American Academy in Rome (2011–2013), a member of the board of directors of the American Council of Learned Societies, (2000–2010), and served on the board of directors of the College Art Association (1991–2001—President 1998–2000). He is 2017 recipient of the gold medal for Distinguished Achievement in Archaeology from the Archaeological Institute of America.

Bibliography
Clarke, John R. (2003), Roman Sex: 100 B.C. to 100 A.D., Abrams, 
Clarke, John R. (2003), Art in the Lives of Ordinary Romans: Visual Representation and Non-elite Viewers in Italy, 100 B.C.-A.D. 315, University of California Press, 

Clarke, John R. (1991),The Houses of Roman Italy, 100 B.C.-A.D. 250: Ritual, Space, and Decoration. Berkeley: University of California Press, 

Clarke, John R. and Nayla K. Muntasser, eds. (2014), Villa A (“of Poppaea”) at Torre Annunziata, Italy (50 B.C.-A.D. 79). Volume 2: The Decorations: Painting, Stucco, Pavements, Sculptures. New York: The Humanities E-Book Series of the American Council of Learned Societies, 2019. Open Access permanent link: https://www.fulcrum.org/concern/monographs/tb09j7416
Clarke, John R. and Nayla K. Muntasser, eds. (2019),Villa A (“of Poppaea”) at Torre Annunziata, Italy (50 B.C.-A.D. 79). Volume 1: The Ancient Setting and Modern Rediscovery. New York: The Humanities E-Book Series of the American Council of Learned Societies, 2014. Open Access permanent link: https://www.fulcrum.org/concern/monographs/tb09j7416?locale=en
Clarke, John R. and Elaine K. Gazda, eds. Leisure and Luxury in the Age of Nero: The Villas of Oplontis near Pompeii (2016), Exhibition catalogue. The Kelsey Museum of Archaeology, University of Michigan, Ann Arbor; The Museum of the Rockies, Montana State University; Smith College, 10 February 2016 – 31 August 2017, Kelsey Museum of Archaeology, 
Clarke, John R. ed. and trans. (2015), The Mediterranean Foundations of Ancient Art. Mittelmeerstudien vol. 4, Critical introduction and first English edition and translation of Guido Kaschnitz von Weinberg, Die mittelmeerischen Grundlagen der antiken Kunst (Frankfurt: Vittorio Klostermann, 1944), Ferdinand Schöningh,

References

Living people
American art historians
University of Texas at Austin faculty
Year of birth missing (living people)